The China Lake Murders is a 1990 television film starring Tom Skerritt. It is about a small desert town that experiences a series of murders. The film was rated PG-13 and first aired on the USA Network and for many years held the record for the highest rated basic cable film.
It is an adaptation of the 1983 short film "China Lake" by Robert Harmon.

Synopsis
The sheriff of China Lake is confronted with a series of grisly murders that have shocked the small desert town. During the investigation, he befriends a vacationing highway patrolman who is eager to join in the investigation. As facts about the killings surface, the sheriff is forced to put his new friendship to the test.

Cast
 Tom Skerritt as Sheriff Sam Brodie
 Michael Parks as Officer Jack Donnelly
 Lauren Tewes as Kitty
 Nancy Everhard as Cindy
 Doug Mears as Deputy Bobby
 Gary McGurk as Wyler
 Bill McKinney as Captain Finney
 Hans Howes as Assistant Watch Commander
 Tom Dahlgren as Lewis Harrelson
 Lara Parker as Helene Harrelson
 David L. Crowley as Unknown 
 Lonny Chapman as Unknown 
 J.C. Quinn as Unknown 
 Mary Maldonado as Enid
 Jack Kehler as "Germ"
 Dennis Rucker as Police Sergeant
 Danny Hassel as Highway Patrol Officer
 Roger Rook as Handcuffed Man

References

External links
 

1990 television films
1990 films
1990 crime thriller films
1990s English-language films
1990s mystery thriller films
American crime thriller films
American mystery thriller films
American thriller television films
Crime television films
Films directed by Alan Metzger
USA Network original films
1990s American films